Adıyaman Airport  is an airport located at Adıyaman, Adıyaman Province, Turkey.

Airlines and destinations

Traffic Statistics 

(*)Source: DHMI.gov.tr
The airport was closed for runway works for part of 2011.

References

External links

Airports in Turkey
Buildings and structures in Adıyaman Province
Transport in Adıyaman Province